The 2014 season was Stabæk's first season back in the Tippeligaen following their relegation in 2012, their 18th season in the top flight of Norwegian football and their first season with Bob Bradley as their manager. They finished the season in 9th place whilst also reaching the Semifinals of the Norwegian Cup where they were beaten by eventual winners Molde.

Season Events
On 3 January, Bob Bradley was officially announced as Stabæk's new manager.

On 22 June 2014 it was announced that former USMNT starlet, Freddy Adu, was now training with the club.

Squad

Transfers

Winter

In:

 
 

Out:

Summer

In:

Out:

Competitions

Tippeligaen

Results summary

Results by round

Results

Table

Norwegian Cup

Squad statistics

Appearances and goals

|-
|colspan="14"|Players away from Stabæk on loan:
|-
|colspan="14"|Players who appeared for Stabæk no longer at the club:

|}

Goal scorers

Disciplinary record

References

Stabæk Fotball seasons
Stabaek